The 2014 Ball State Cardinals football team represented Ball State University in the 2014 NCAA Division I FBS football season. They were led by fourth-year head coach Pete Lembo and played their home games at Scheumann Stadium. They were a member of the West Division of the Mid-American Conference. They finished the season 5–7, 4–4 in MAC play to finish in fifth place in the West Division.

Schedule

References

Ball State
Ball State Cardinals football seasons
Ball State Cardinals football